The Breeders' Cup Classic is a Grade I Weight for Age thoroughbred horse race for 3-year-olds and older run at a distance of  on dirt. It is held annually at a different racetrack as part of the Breeders' Cup World Championships in late October or early November. All of the races to date have been held in the United States except for the 1996 edition held at Woodbine Racetrack in Toronto, Canada.

The Classic is considered by many to be the premier thoroughbred horse race of the year in the U.S., although the Kentucky Derby is more widely known among casual racing fans. Once the richest race in the world, in more recent years, only the Saudi Cup, Dubai World Cup, The Everest and Prix de l'Arc de Triomphe have had consistently higher purses. Often, the winner of the Classic goes on to win U.S. Horse of the Year honors, including the four winners of the race between 2004 and 2007—respectively Ghostzapper, Saint Liam, Invasor, and Curlin. Due to the extremely high quality of horses in the event, the race is notoriously hard to predict. One notable example of an underdog winning the Classic is the victory of Arcangues in 1993. This was the biggest upset in Breeders' Cup history and his $269.20 payoff for a $2 wager remains a Breeders' Cup record.

The Classic is now regarded as the fourth leg of horse racing's Grand Slam of Thoroughbred racing — the traditional Triple Crown (Kentucky Derby, Preakness Stakes, and Belmont Stakes) plus the Breeders' Cup Classic.  After American Pharoah's Triple Crown win earlier in 2015, the term became popular;  the colt became the first horse to ever accomplish this feat.

Notable renewals

1980s
The first running of the Breeders' Cup Classic in 1984 produced an exciting finish between 30–1 longshot Wild Again on the inside, Gate Dancer on the outside and favorite Slew o' Gold in between. The three battled down the stretch with Wild Again shifting his path away from the rail and Gate Dancer "lugging in" towards the rail, squeezing out Slew O' Gold. Wild Again finished a neck in front of Gate Dancer with Slew o' Gold less than a length behind. After a 10-minute stewards' inquiry, Wild Again was left in first place but Gate Dancer was disqualified to third.

The 1987 renewal featured the face-off between two Kentucky Derby winners, Ferdinand and Alysheba. Ferdinand, who won the Derby in 1986, reached the lead in mid-stretch, then struggled to hold off the late charge of Alysheba. In a photo finish, Ferdinand prevailed by a nose and would later be named Horse of the Year. Alysheba came back in 1988 to win the Classic, becoming the then-leading money earner in history.

In the 1989 renewal, Sunday Silence and Easy Goer faced off for the last time in one of racing's most famous rivalries. Sunday Silence had beaten Easy Goer in the Kentucky Derby and Preakness Stakes but Easy Goer turned the tables in the Belmont. Easy Goer then won the Whitney, Travers, Woodward and Jockey Club Gold Cup, making him the 1–2 favorite in the Classic. Sunday Silence raced five lengths behind the early leaders, with Easy Goer six lengths further behind. Easy Goer made a move down the backstretch and got next to Sunday Silence, who then made his own move as they rounded the final turn. Sunday Silence opened up a three-length lead, but Easy Goer again started closing down the stretch. At the wire, Sunday Silence prevailed by a neck, earning him Horse of the Year honors.

1990s
The 1993 renewal saw the biggest upset in Breeders' Cup history when the French-based Arcangues won at odds of 133–1. California-based horses had dominated at Santa Anita in the preceding races, and Bertrando was expected to continue the trend. He set the early pace and had a comfortable lead coming down the stretch, only to be caught near the wire. Arcangues' jockey Jerry Bailey had timed the run perfectly, even though he had never ridden the horse before. "I couldn't understand the instructions the trainer (André Fabre) gave me in the paddock", he said. "I don't even know how to pronounce the horse's name. But sometimes a horse runs best when he is ridden by someone who has never been on him before."

In 1995, Cigar came into the Classic having won seven straight Grade I races and was made the 3–5 favorite. On a muddy track, he scored a  length victory in the excellent time of 1:59, then the fastest Classic ever run. When calling the race, track announcer Tom Durkin referred to him as the "unconquerable, invincible, unbeatable" Cigar – a phrase that would be associated with the horse for the rest of his life.

2000s
Although Tiznow won the Breeders' Cup Classic and Horse of the Year honors in 2000, he is best known for his effort in the 2001 renewal. Tiznow experienced a variety of physical problems throughout the year and came into the Classic with only two wins in five starts. Facing him was an exceptionally strong European contingent that included Galileo and Sakhee. The 2001 Breeders' Cup took place at Belmont Park in New York and was the first major sporting event since 9–11, so security was exceptionally heavy. Europeans won many of the early races on the card and looked set to take the Classic when Sakhee hit the lead in mid-stretch. Tiznow fought back and won the race by a nose, with Tom Durkin calling, "Tiznow wins it for America!" Tiznow became the first and to-date only two-time winner of the Classic.

In the 2009 Classic, Zenyatta came into the Breeders' Cup with a perfect record of 13 wins from 13 starts. Rather than trying to defend her title in the Ladies Classic (now known as the Distaff), her connections decided to enter her in the Classic against male horses. The race was run on Santa Anita's Polytrack synthetic dirt surface, which attracted several turf competitors including Gio Ponti (Man o' War, Arlington Million), Twice Over (Champion Stakes) and Rip Van Winkle (Sussex, Queen Elizabeth II), who hoped to repeat Raven's Pass upset victory in the 2008 Classic. The field also included Mine That Bird (Kentucky Derby), Summer Bird (Belmont and Travers) and Einstein (Santa Anita Handicap), but Quality Road (Florida Derby) was scratched when he refused to load in the starting gate. When the race finally got underway, Zenyatta broke poorly and on the wrong lead. As was her custom, she dropped far back in the early running then started her move around the far turn. Jockey Mike Smith guided her between horses near the rail, then swung the mare wide as they entered the stretch. Zenyatta quickly regained stride and closed on the early leaders, winning by a length over Gio Ponti. Mike Smith believed she would have won by more if she had not slowed when the crowd started to react. "She started pricking her ears and looking at the crowd", he said. "And she still went, believe it or not, well within herself. She was pricking her ears and galloped out. She didn't even take a breath after the race was over. It's just incredible." Zenyatta became the first and still the only female horse to win the Classic.

Automatic berths

Beginning in 2007, the Breeders' Cup developed the Breeders' Cup Challenge, a series of races in each division that allotted automatic qualifying bids to winners of defined races. Each of the fourteen divisions has multiple qualifying races. Note though that one horse may win multiple challenge races, while other challenge winners will not be entered in the Breeders' Cup for a variety of reasons such as injury or travel considerations.

In the Classic division, runners are limited to 14 and there are up to eight automatic berths. The 2022 "Win and You're In" races were:
 The February Stakes, a Grade 1 race run in February at Tokyo Racecourse in Japan
The Stephen Foster Handicap, a Grade 2 race run in June at Churchill Downs in Louisville, Kentucky
The Haskell Invitational, a Grade 1 race run in July at Monmouth Park in New Jersey
The Whitney Handicap, a Grade 1 race run in August at Saratoga Race Course in upstate New York
The International Stakes, a Group One race run in August at York Racecourse in England
The Pacific Classic, a Grade 1 race run in September at Del Mar Racetrack in San Diego, California
The Awesome Again Stakes, a Grade 1 race run in October at Santa Anita Park in California 
The Jockey Club Gold Cup, a Grade 1 race run in September at Belmont Park in Elmont, New York

Records
Most wins:
 2 – Tiznow (2000, 2001)

Stakes record:
 The fastest time recorded in the Breeders Cup Classic belongs to Ghostzapper, who set the mark of 1:59:02 under Javier Castellano in 2004 at Lone Star Park. Because the Breeders' Cup Classic is run at different racetracks each year, some of which are faster than others, there is no official stakes record. Note though that Authentic's revised time of 1:59.60 set a record at Keeneland, Ghostzapper's time of 1:59.02 set a track record at Lone Star Park and Alphabet Soup's time of 2:01.0 set a track record on Woodbine's old dirt track.

Largest winning margins:
 8 1/4 lengths - Flightline (2022)

Most wins by a jockey:
 5 – Chris McCarron (1988, 1989, 1996, 2000, 2001)
 5 – Jerry Bailey (1991, 1993, 1994, 1995, 2005)

Most wins by a trainer:
 4 – Bob Baffert (2014, 2015, 2016, 2020)

Most wins by an owner:
 2 – Stronach Stables (1998, 2004)

Winners

See also
 Breeders' Cup Classic "top three finishers" and starters
 American thoroughbred racing top attended events
 Grand Slam of Thoroughbred Racing

References

External links
Official Breeders' Cup website

Classic
Open middle distance horse races
Grade 1 stakes races in the United States
Graded stakes races in the United States
Recurring sporting events established in 1984
1984 establishments in California